Petar Konjović (5 May 1883 – 1 October 1970) was a Serbian composer and academic.

Education and career
While a pedagogy student in Čurug, Konjović self-taught himself the art of compositure and conducting. He finished his education at the Prague Conservatorium in 1906. In 1907, he travelled to Belgrade, following an invitation from Stevan Mokranjac to teach composition at the Belgrade Music Academy. In 1920, he toured Europe as a pianist. He was an active adherent of the idea of Yugoslavia. He was manager of numerous cultural institutions: head of the Serbian National Theater in Novi Sad, director of the Zagreb Opera, and head of the Croatian National Theater in Osijek. He was also a Rector of the Music Academy in Belgrade, and a founder of the SANU Musicology Institute. His contemporaries were Petar Krstić, Isidor Bajić, Miloje Milojević, Stevan Hristić, Stanislav Binički, Bozidar Joksimović, Kosta Manojlović, Vladimir Đorđević (brother of folklorist Tihomir Đorđević), and others.

Works
Konjović is the most significant representative of the nationalism of the Serbian modernism in music. His most famous works are his operas. The period between two world wars was defined by Konjović who introduced several genres into Serbian music.

Being nationally determined, Petar Konjovic’s musical language is founded on and belongs to the period of late romanticism. However, it includes elements of impressionism and expressionism which was characteristic for many composers of 1920s and 1930s (Rachmaninoff, Prokofiev, Sibelius). Likewise, his musical directions towards folklore expressionism also included him in the group of musicians close to Leosh Janachek, Bella Bartok, Igor Stravinsky which belong to the early “Russian” period.

In his operas, he focused on setting texts that were related to historical events and individuals, and his vocal writings was strongly influenced by the natural inflection of his native language. Folk elements are also very much in evidence in his scores, which are distinguished by exceptionally colorful orchestrations.

His Czech experience encouraged his natural inclination toward folk sources and he began developing melodies, like Janáček, out of the inflection of speech. Konjovic's mature style strives for direct communication with broad audience while incorporating a sophistical harmonic vocabulary. His work includes over one hundred folk songs arrangements and twenty original choral pieces.

Operas
 Vilin veo (The vila’s veil) also known as Ženidba Miloša Obilića (The Marriage of Miloš Obilić) 1917,
 Knez od Zete (The Prince of Zeta), a realist drama based on the play Maxim Crnojević by the Serbian poet Laza Kostić (1841–1910) itself based on a folk poem The Marriage of Maxim Crnojević. Opera first performed in Belgrade, 1929, conducted by Lovro von Matačić. The musical representation of this opera is coloured by Montenegrin songs.
 Koštana 1931, realist opera,
 Seljaci (Peasants) 1951, comic opera. Both Koštana and Seljaci operas are set in Serbian villages and replete with national songs and dances
 Otadžbina (Fatherland) 1960. opera in oratorio style. This opera was his last opera not performed until 1983 at Belgrade. The story was set in the fourteen century at the time of the 1389 battle of Kosovo during which a mother (Majka Jugovića) lost nine sons and husband.

Song collections
 The Lyric 1902–1922
 My Country 100 folk songs. 1905–25

Orchestral works
 Na selu (In the Country)
 Makar Čudra
 Jadranski capriccio (Adriatic Capriccio)
 The first symphony in C minor

Musicology books
 Petar Konjović, Živojin Zdravković: Ogledi o muzici
 Petar Konjović: Miloje Milojević, kompozitor i muzički pisac
 Petar Konjović: Stevan St. Mokranjac

Honors and recognition

 member of the Serbian Academy of Science and Arts (member from 1946, full member from 1948)
 foreign member of the Academy of Science and Art in Prague
 International Competition of Young Musicians “Petar Konjović” (established and held from 1991)
 Primary music school in Belgrade, established in 1979, named after Petar Konjović

Selected recordings
 Songs from 'My Country' Mila Vilotijević, Francesca Giovannelli. Chandos 1999

See also
 Kosta Manojlović
 Petar Krstić
 Miloje Milojević
 Stevan Hristić
 Stevan Mokranjac
 Isidor Bajić
 Stanislav Binički
 Davorin Jenko
 Jovan Đorđević
 Josif Marinković

References

External links

Belgrade Biography 
Serbian Academy of Sciences and Arts Konjović biography

Riznica srpska: Petar Konjović
Petar Konjović: Prva simfonija u ce-molu

1883 births
1970 deaths
20th-century musicologists
Members of the Serbian Academy of Sciences and Arts
People from Žabalj
People from the Kingdom of Hungary
Serbian composers
Serbian musicologists
Academic staff of the University of Arts in Belgrade